Sabina, Duchess of Bavaria (1528–1578) was the daughter of John II, Count Palatine of Simmern and Beatrix of Baden.

Marriage 
In 1544 she married Lamoral, Count of Egmont with whom she had twelve children. When her husband was arrested and accused of treason in 1567, she wrote king Philip II, the king of Spain, a letter to plead for his release. It was to no avail and he was decapitated in the following year.

Children 
 Charles, 7th Count of Egmont, Prince de Gavre: married to Marie de Lens,  Lady of Aubigny.

Widowhood 
After her death in 1578, she was buried next to her husband in Zottegem.

1528 births
1578 deaths
House of Egmond
Daughters of monarchs